Maria do Céu Monteiro is the President of the Supreme Court of Guinea-Bissau. In 2012, she was elected President of the ECOWAS Court.

References

Bissau-Guinean judges
Living people
Year of birth missing (living people)
Place of birth missing (living people)
Chief justices
National supreme court judges
Bissau-Guinean judges of international courts and tribunals